Pallavkumar Prasanta Das (born 17 January 1990) is an Indian cricketer who plays for Assam  in domestic cricket. He is a left-handed opening batsman. Das made his first class debut on 29 November 2011 against Jharkhand at Dhanbad in the 2011–12 Ranji Trophy.

References

External links
 

1990 births
Living people
Indian cricketers
Assam cricketers
Cricketers from Assam